Luke Jumeau (born 12 February 1988) is a New Zealand mixed martial artist, and he competed in the Welterweight division of the Ultimate Fighting Championship (UFC).

Background 
Jumeau was born in Hamilton, New Zealand. Raised by a single mother, his early childhood was a struggle and he got himself into trouble. He changed his life after losing his brother in a tragic accident, channeling his energy in pursuing "a life worthy of both of us" in MMA.

To get into fighting comes easily with Luke as he believes "the warrior spirit lies within all New Zealanders". He works as a panel beater.

Jumeau's fighting style began with boxing, a sport he pursued for several years before switching to mixed martial arts. He put 10 years into achieving his tae kwon do-based black belt.

Mixed martial arts career

Early career 

Jumeau started his MMA career in 2008. He has fought international in New Zealand, Hong Kong, Australia, and Dubai in various promotions. He held a 6 winning streak – all stoppages, prior signed by Ultimate Fighting Championship.

Ultimate Fighting Championship 

Jumeau made his promotion debut on 10 June 2017 at UFC Fight Night: Lewis vs. Hunt against Dominique Steele, in his home country New Zealand.

Steele closely won the first round however, Jumeau was able to come back – nearly knocking out Steele in the second round, and dominating the third. He won the fight with unanimous decision (29–28, 29–28,29–28).

Jumeau faced Shinsho Anzai on 23 September 2017 at UFC Fight Night 117. He lost the fight by unanimous decision with the score board of (29–28, 29–28, 30–27).

Jumeau faced Daichi Abe on his third fight on 11 February 2018 at UFC 221. He won the fight via unanimous decision.

Jumeau was scheduled to face Geoff Neal on 2 December 2018 at UFC Fight Night 142. However, it was reported on early November, 2018 that Jumeau pulled from the card due to injury.

Jumeau faced Dhiego Lima on 6 October 2019 at UFC 243. He lost the fight via split decision.

Jumeau was released by the UFC on February 11, 2020.

Personal life 
Luke prefers to use the moniker "Juggernaut" instead of "The Jedi" as he has heavy hands and is naturally strong. "The Jedi" was done by a local New Zealand promoter due to his calm and collective demeanor in the cage where a Star Wars theme video was made for him on the promotion.

Mixed martial arts record

|-
|Loss
|align=center|13–5
|Dhiego Lima
|Decision (split)
|UFC 243 
|
|align=center|3
|align=center|5:00
|Melbourne, Australia
|
|-
|Win
|align=center|13–4
|Daichi Abe
|Decision (unanimous)
|UFC 221 
|
|align=center|3
|align=center|5:00
|Perth, Australia
|
|-
| Loss
|align=center|12–4
|Shinsho Anzai
|Decision (unanimous)
|UFC Fight Night: Saint Preux vs. Okami 
|
|align=center|3
|align=center|5:00
|Saitama, Japan
|
|-
| Win
| align=center| 12–3
| Dominique Steele
| Decision (unanimous)
| UFC Fight Night: Lewis vs. Hunt
| 
| align=center| 3
| align=center| 5:00
| Auckland, New Zealand
|
|-
| Win
| align=center| 11–3
| Vik Grujic
| TKO (punches)
| Sledgehammer Promotions: Legend MMA 1
| 
| align=center| 2
| align=center| 1:32
| Gold Coast, Australia
|
|-
| Win
| align=center| 10–3
| Askar Mozharov
| Submission (guillotine choke)
| Rebel FC 4
| 
| align=center| 1
| align=center| 1:47
| Qingdao, China
|
|-
| Win
| align=center| 9–3
| Damien Fraser
| TKO (elbows)
| Xtreme Fighting Championship 26
| 
| align=center| 1
| align=center| 2:40
| Brisbane, Australia
|
|-
| Win
| align=center| 8–3
| Yasuaki Miura
| TKO (punches)
| PRO FC 10
| 
| align=center| 1
| align=center| 1:36
| Taipei, Taiwan
|
|-
| Win
| align=center| 7–3
| Mohammad Mansouri Davar
| Submission (rear-naked choke)
| Global Fighting Championship 4
| 
| align=center| 2
| align=center| 2:07
| Dubai, United Arab Emirates
|
|-
| Win
| align=center| 6–3
| Hossein Mollamahdi
| KO (punch)
| Global Fighting Championship 3
| 
| align=center| 1
| align=center| N/A
| Dubai, United Arab Emirates
|
|-
| Loss
| align=center| 5–3
| Jake Matthews
| Submission (rear-naked choke
| Australian Fighting Championship 59
| 
| align=center| 2
| align=center| 1:14
| Melbourne, Australia
|
|-
| Loss
| align=center| 5–2
| Li Jingliang
| Submission (guillotine choke)
| Legend Fighting Championship 11
| 
| align=center| 3
| align=center| 3:38
| Kuala Lumpur, Malaysia
|
|-
| Win
| align=center| 5–1
| Alex Niu
| Decision (unanimous)
| Legend Fighting Championship 10
| 
| align=center| 3
| align=center| 5:00
| Hong Kong, SAR, China
|
|-
| Loss
| align=center| 4–1
| Jacques Marsters
| N/A
| Supremacy Fighting Championship 9
| 
| align=center| N/A
| align=center| N/A
| Auckland, New Zealand
|
|-
| Win
| align=center| 4–0
| David Johnson
| Decision (split)
| Fight Night
| 
| align=center| 3
| align=center| 5:00
| Melbourne, Australia
|
|-
|Win
| align=center| 3–0
| Roman Hunt
| Submission (triangle choke)
| Supremacy Cage Fighting 7
| 
| align=center| 2
| align=center| 0:00
| Auckland, New Zealand
|
|-
| Win
| align=center| 2–0
| Pete Parata
| KO (punch)
| ICNZ 10
| 
| align=center| 2
| align=center| 0:57
| Auckland, New Zealand
|
|-
| Win
| align=center| 1–0
| Jamie Toon
| Submission (guillotine choke)
| Fight Night 3
| 
| align=center| 2
| align=center| 0:37
| Hamilton, New Zealand
|
|-

See also
 List of current UFC fighters
 List of male mixed martial artists

References

External links
 
 

1988 births
Living people
Sportspeople from Hamilton, New Zealand
New Zealand male mixed martial artists
Welterweight mixed martial artists
Mixed martial artists utilizing taekwondo
Mixed martial artists utilizing Brazilian jiu-jitsu
New Zealand male taekwondo practitioners
New Zealand practitioners of Brazilian jiu-jitsu
Ultimate Fighting Championship male fighters